, also called  in Japan,  in Korea, and  in Vietnam, is a type of crown that was traditionally worn by the Emperors of China, Japan, Korea, and kings in the cultural sphere of East Asia.

The  is a type of crown that originated in China; it was worn by the Emperor, by his ministers, and by aristocrats. Among all the type of Chinese headwear, the mianguan was the most expensive type; it was reserved especially for important sacrificial events. Regulations on the shape and its making was set during the Eastern Han dynasty and used in the succeeding dynasties only to be ended at the fall of the Ming dynasty in the 16th century AD.

In Japan, the  has been worn by Emperors as a crown since the Nara period when the Chinese-style  was introduced from the Tang dynasty. Emperor Shōmu was reported to be the first emperor in Japan to be fully dressed into  (a form of Chinese ceremonial clothing), which included the Chinese-style  in 732 AD during the New Year court assembly.

It is also used in Vietnam, and the monarchs of the Joseon Dynasty also wore the equivalent .

(China) 

The  was not used in Western Han.

The  revived crown based on the literature, after which it was then used in rituals and important ceremonies in various dynasties. However, there are mutual contradictions in the descriptions of the documents and their ancient notes, and each dynasty often revised them.

Regulations on the shape and its making was set during the Eastern Han dynasty and used in the succeeding dynasties only to be ended at the fall of the Ming dynasty in the 16th century AD. The basic shape of the Chinese  remained the same from ancient times to the Ming Dynasty.

The  stopped being used in China since the fall of the Ming dynasty and the establishment of the Qing dynasty by the Manchu. Instead, a unique Manchu crown called the 'morning crown' ( in Manchu) was used. The Manchu crown was shaped like an umbrella, and the top of the crown was decorated with a special pearl-encrusted ornament called the morning pearl.

(Japan)

Emperor's crown
However, the crown has not survived to the present day.

Among the Shōsōin treasures, there is a  worn by Emperor Shōmu that has been damaged and is called . The crown does not retain its original form, but there are metal openwork pieces with phoenix, clouds and arabesque patterns, as well as pearls, coral and glass beads threaded through the crown.

The  worn by Japanese emperors is often referred to as a "Tang-style crown", but it is actually quite different from the  worn in China. The  worn by the emperor in the Edo period consisted of a metal frame placed on top of an openwork gilt-bronze base called the "heavenly crown", with forty-eight jewels hanging from the edge of the frame, twelve on each side.

The painting Silken Painting of Emperor Go-Daigo prominently displays the Benkan of Emperor Go-Daigo which is said to be the crown of Emperor Jimmu. The crown differs greatly from the Chinese crown, in that there is a bright vermillion sun decoration protruding from the front of the crown. The crown has twelve tassels spread across all sides rather than merely two as in the Chinese form (six strands as only two sides of the crown are shown in the image), indicating that this is the crown used by the emperor when he is dressed in formal attire.

The  worn by Emperor Go-Sai and his successors during the coronation ceremony is preserved in the Imperial Collection of the Kyoto Imperial Palace.

Empress' crown

The  does not have a crown board or similar metal frame on top of the crown, and there is no hair hanging from the crown board. There are ornaments hanging from both ears and the beak of the phoenix, which are decorated with flowers. The  is accompanied by a hairpin, a foreign object and a small bow.

The Order of the Precious Crown, established in 1888 (the 21st year of the Meiji) to be awarded to women, is a reference to this, and the center of the insignia is decorated with the image of a precious .

(Vietnam) 

Construction and design 

The  is composed of:

On both sides of the mianguan, there was a hole where an emerald hairpin could pass through so that the crown could be fastened to the hair bun of its wearer. The silk cord was tied on one end of the hairpin and would then be tied on the other side of the hairpin passing under the chin.

The 12 tassels dangles down the shoulders and were made of jade beads of multiple colours which would sway with the wearer's movement.

In addition, there was the nine-tasselled crown, worn by dukes and the Crown Prince's servants. The eight-tasselled crown was worn by princes and dukes. The  (seven-tasselled crown) was worn by ministers. The five-tasselled crown was worn by viscounts and barons.

The quantity and quality of the jewellery were an important marker of social ranking. In the Han dynasty, the emperor would use 12 strings of white jade, 7 strings of blue jade were used by dukes and princes, and black jade were used for ministers.

Cultural significance 
The  was designed to strengthen the charismatic authority of its wearer which was conferred by the head. This is similar to the Mandate of Heaven concept in which there is a rationalization of divine authority.

Related items 

Since China was a crown-wearing culture, there were many crowns for different ranks, positions, and times.

  – a crown worn by an empress (e.g.  – crowns of Empress Xiao Danxian and Empress Dowager Xiao Jing excavated from the Dingling site, two each)

See also 
 
 Imperial crown
 List of Hanfu headwear

References 
Notes
Sources

Bibliography 

 松平乘昌『図説宮中柳営の秘宝』 河出書房新社、2006年。。
 『服周之冕』中華書局、2009年。

External links 

Vietnamese clothing
Chinese clothing
Hats
Headgear
Crowns (headgear)
Pages with unreviewed translations
Japanese monarchy
Chinese headgear